Sweden held a general election in March 1914 to finish off the original Riksdag term before the regular election later that year.

Results

Regional results

Percentage share

By votes

County results
After the dissolution of first-past-the-post, there were usually several constituencies per county as a remnant. In this results list, votes have been registered based on counties, with the exception of Stockholm and the namesake county which had separate counting areas.

Percentage share

By votes

References

Results of the 1914 March